K157 or K-157 may refer to:

K-157 (Kansas highway), a state highway in Kansas
Russian submarine Vepr (K-157), a Russian submarine